Moistboyz is an American hard rock band formed in New Hope, Pennsylvania in 1991 by Guy Heller and Mickey Melchiondo. Moistboyz music is typically fast-paced punk/metal, combining stream-of-consciousness lyrics with aggressive rock guitar riffs. 

As in Melchiondo's band Ween, both he and Heller assume aliases: Mickey Moist and Dickie Moist.

History
Moistboyz have released five studio records starting with the 1994 EP Moistboyz. A full-length album, Moistboyz II, followed in 1996. Recorded by Heller (vocals/lyrics) and Melchiondo (guitar/music) using drum machine and a lo-fi sensibility, both records were originally released on the Beastie Boys label, Grand Royal. In 2005, these first two records were combined and released as one album, Moistboyz I+II on Sanctuary Records, now on Chocodog Records.

In 2002, Moistboyz III was released on Mike Patton's label, Ipecac Records. This is the first Moistboyz record to feature songs with real drums, performed by Lou Croschetti.

Moistboyz IV was released in 2005 on Sanctuary Records. The album was mixed by Chris Shaw, features Claude Coleman, Jr. on drums, and bass by producer Andrew Weiss on Fuck You.

In 2013, Moistboyz V was released on Heller and Melchiondo's label, Neverman Records, distributed by MVD Audio. Recording started in late 2012 in New Hope, PA and finished in Lago Vista, TX in early 2013. It was produced and engineered by Melchiondo, and mixed by Stephen Haas. Moistboyz V covers multiple musical styles, such as the southern rock-influenced Down on the Farm and the alt ballad "My Time to Die". Guest musicians include Chuck Treece (drums) on "Protect and Serve", "Medusa", "Garbageman" and Joe Kramer (guitar) on "Protect and Serve", "Chickendick", "Down on the Farm" and "My Time to Die".

Members
Guy Heller (aka Dickie Moist)
Michael Melchiondo, Jr. (aka Mickey Moist)

Current touring members
Stephen Haas
Nick Oliveri (Mondo Generator) (Queens of the Stone Age)
Hoss Wright (Mondo Generator)

Previous touring members
Claude Coleman Jr. (Ween, Amandla, Eagles of Death Metal) 
Dave Dreiwitz (Ween, Marco Benevento, Instant Death)
Bill Fowler (Sound of Urchin)
Chris Harfenist (Sound of Urchin)
Jeff Pinkus (Butthole Surfers)

Discography
Moistboyz (1994)

References

External links
 

Hard rock musical groups from Pennsylvania
Musical groups established in 1991
1991 establishments in Pennsylvania